Jo Hyo-Bi (born 1991) is a South Korean handball player. She plays for the club Incheon, and on the South Korean national team. She competed for the Korean team at the 2012 Summer Olympics in London.

References

South Korean female handball players
1991 births
Living people
Handball players at the 2012 Summer Olympics
Olympic handball players of South Korea